Peter Schwickerath (born 1942 in Düsseldorf) is a German sculptor.

Biography 
Born in 1942 in Düsseldorf, Peter Schwickerath studied from 1964 in the sculptor class of Adolf Wamper at the Folkwang University of the Arts in Essen. 1965 he became assistant to the sculptor Curt Beckmann. 1966 changed Schwickerath at the Kunstakademie Düsseldorf, where he studied sculpture under Manfred Sieler and Norbert Kricke.

Since 1968 Peter Schwickerath is self-employed as a freelance sculptor with his own studio.

1988 on the occasion of the 700th anniversary of Düsseldorf, he was organizer of the ″Kunstachse – Skulptur D-88″, in which more than 40 objects were placed between the old town and the main courtyard. Some of them remained in place.

1981-1982 idea and organization of: ″Das ambulante Museum I + II″, the Stinnes AG, Mülheim an der Ruhr.

Peter Schwickerath lives and works in Düsseldorf, Germany and Punta del Este, Uruguay.

Work 
The ratio of mass and space, volume and space and the effect of surface directions in space, is the subject of his work. The surface of the body as a boundary, the line for coinciding body surfaces, as well as the color and structure of the material are the means. Peter Schwickerath preferably clearly defined shapes for his metal sculptures, such as the square pillar and the cylinder. These have, in their different arrangement and the interplay of mass and volume, display the destination, spatial relationships and to make recognizable. Schwickerath's special interest is the variety of ways in formal simplicity and austerity .

Numerous large sculptures are in public space, in sculpture parks at home and abroad, as well to private collections.

Gallery

Public sculptures 
 Düsseldorf: Düsseldorf-Oberkassel, Nordpark, Kaiserpfalz Kaiserswerth
 Blomberg, North Rhine-Westphalia: Amts und Landgericht
 Arnsberg: Regierungspräsidium
 Mülheim: Deutsche Post, Hauptbahnhof Mülheim
 Herne, North Rhine-Westphalia: Skulpturenpark Flottmann-Hallen
 Ahlen: Skulpturenpark Kunstmuseum
 Marl, North Rhine-Westphalia: Skulpturenprojekt
 Lehnin: Oberfinanz-Akademie
 Göppingen: Christophsbad
 Unna: Hochschulcampus
 El Chorro, Uruguay: Fundación Pablo Atchugarry
 Punta del Este: La Concentida

Exhibitions 
 1967: Modehaus Heinemann, Düsseldorf
 1968: Winterausstellung, Museum Kunstpalast, Düsseldorf
 1969: Plastiken und Grafiken, Altes Kino Düsseldorf-Lohausen 
 1970: Skulptur, Knoll International, Düsseldorf
 1972: Winterausstellung Museum Kunstpalast, Düsseldorf
 1973: Forum Junger Kunst, Kunsthalle Recklinghausen
 1974: Kunst in der Stadt, Stadthalle Solingen
 1975: Nachbarschaft, Kunsthalle Düsseldorf
 1977: 50 Künstler aus NRW, Cultureel Centrum, Venlo 
 1977: Grands et Jeunes du aujourd’hui, Grand Palais, Paris
 1977: Das Revier als Faszination?, Schloss Oberhausen
 1978: Drei Bildhauer in der Villa Engelhardt, Düsseldorf 
 1978: 100 deutsche Künstler, Krakau, Polen
 1981: Skulptur Drei mal Drei, Stadtmuseum Landeshauptstadt Düsseldorf
 1982: Vier Düsseldorfer Bildhauer, Skulpturenmuseum Glaskasten, Marl
 1983: Plastiken, Stadtgalerie Altena
 1984: 80 von 400 Künstlern in der Mathildenhöhe, Darmstadt
 1985: Art 16' 85, Basel
 1986: Plastiken Thyssengas, Duisburg 
 1986: Vebiskus Kunstverein, Schaffhausen
 1987: Westdeutscher Künstlerbund, Hagen
 1988: Kunstverein und Städtisches Museum, Wesel 
 1988: Galerie Art and be, München
 1990: Schwarz konkret, Städtische Galerie, Lüdenscheid
 1991: Plastiken 91 Xylon, Museum Schwetzingen
 1992: Skulptur und Grafik, Kunstverein, Schwelm
 1993: Skulptur und Grafik, Galerie Fochem, Krefeld
 1994: Westdeutscher Künstlerbund, Kunsthalle Recklinghausen
 1996: Skulptur und Zeichnung, Kunstmuseum Ahlen
 1996: Skulptur und Zeichnung, Städtische Galerie Lüdenscheid
 2000: Galerie am Eichholz, Murnau
 2001: Galerie Fochem, Krefeld
 2001: Westdeutscher Künstlerbund, Museum Bochum
 2002: Perspektiven II, Galerie Meißner, Hamburg
 2003: Egon Zehnder International, Hamburg
 2004: Stahlskulptur aussen, Flottmann-Hallen, Herne
 2004: FERRUM, Zeche Unser Fritz, Herne
 2005: Galerie Fochem, Krefeld
 2005: Galerie am Eichholz, Murnau
 2006: 3. Schweizerische Trienale der Skulptur, Bad Ragaz
 2007: Städtisches Museum, Kalkar
 2007: Leicht und schwer, Galerie Feder, Murnau
 2009: 4. Schweizerische Trienale der Skulptur, Bad Ragaz
 2010: Große Düsseldorfer Kunstausstellung
 2010: Landpartie, Westdeutscher Künstlerbund
 2010: Skulpturenpark, Flottmann–Hallen, Herne
 2011: Galerie Fochem, Krefeld
 2011: Blickachsen 8, Bad Homburg
 2011: Galerie 15a, Lochem, Niederlande
 2011: Stahlzentrum, Düsseldorf
 2011: Grosse Düsseldorfer, Düsseldorf
 2011: Metall konkret, Galerie St. Johann, Saarbrücken
 2012: Galerie 15a, Lochem, Niederlande
 2013: Galerie 15a, Lochem, Niederlande
 2014: Kunstverein Onomato, Düsseldorf
 2014: Stahlplastik in Deutschland - gestern und heute, Kunstverein Wilhelmshöhe, Ettlingen
 2015: Flottmann–Hallen, Herne
 2015: Galerie Fochem, Krefeld
 2016: Juego de Austeras Formas en Acero‘, Skulpturenpark Fundación Pablo Atchugarry, Punta del Este, Uruguay

Further reading 
 Vier Düsseldorfer Bildhauer: William Brauhauser, Hagen Hilderhof, Peter Schwickerath, Jun Suzuki. Ausstellung im Skulpturenmuseum Glaskasten Marl, 1982
 Peter Schwickerath: Skulptur D-88, Ausst. Kat., Düsseldorf 1988, edited by the Verein zur Veranstaltung von Kunstausstellungen, Düsseldorf, 
 Stahl, Raum, Niederrhein. Kunstverein u. Städt. Museum Wesel, Galerie im Centrum, 1988, 
 Smerling, Walter und Ferdinand Ullrich [ed.]: Public Art Ruhr. Die Metropole Ruhr und die Kunst im öffentlichen Raum. Cologne 2012, S. 168f.
 Stahlskulptur aussen: Peter Schwickerath; Flottmann-Hallen, July - October 2004, Hrsg. Stadt Herne, Der Oberbürgermeister, Autoren: Uwe Rüth, Hermann Ühlein,

References

External links 
 Website Peter Schwickerath
 Kunst im öffentlichen Raum, Peter Schwickerath, Faltungen (1983), Mülheim an der Ruhr
 Die gebogenen Skulpturen von Peter Schwickerath Westdeutsche Zeitung,  November 24, 2011
 kunstgebiet.ruhr,  Peter Schwickerath Stahlschnitt, 2004
 Fundación Pablo Atchugarry
 Sculpture Park, Fundación Pablo Atchugarry

1942 births
Living people
Artists from Düsseldorf
20th-century German sculptors
20th-century German male artists
German male sculptors
21st-century German sculptors
21st-century German male artists